This is a list of flag bearers who have represented Zambia at the Olympics.

Flag bearers carry the national flag of their country at the opening ceremony of the Olympic Games.

See also
Zambia at the Olympics

References

Zambia at the Olympics
Zambia
Olympic flagbearers
Olympics